Eucalyptus tectifica, commonly known as Darwin box, or grey box, is a species of tree that is endemic to northern Australia. It has rough, fibrous or flaky bark on the trunk and branches, lance-shaped or curved adult leaves, flower buds usually in groups of seven, creamy white flowers and conical, cup-shaped or barrel-shaped fruit.

Description
It has rough, fibrous or flaky greyish bark on the trunk and branches. The tree is deciduous or partly deciduous during the dry season. Flowering occurs from October to December and the flowers are creamy white.

Taxonomy and naming
Eucalyptus tectifica  was first formally described by the botanist Ferdinand von Mueller in 1859 in Journal of the Proceedings of the Linnean Society, Botany. The specific epithet (tectifica) is from Latin words meaning "a roof" and "to make", indicating the use of the bark by Aboriginal people to make shelters.

Distribution and habitat
Darwin box occurs across northern Australia from near Broome in Western Australia to Darwin in the Northern Territory, then as far east as near Normanton in Queensland and on some islands in the Gulf of Carpentaria. It is found on hillsides and along creeks in woodland, where it grows in skeletal sandy alluvium over quartzite, sandstone or basalt.

Conservation status
This eucalypt is classified as "not threatened" by the Western Australian Government Department of Parks and Wildlife, as "least concern" under the Northern Territory Government Territory Parks and Wildlife Conservation Act 2000 and as  "least concern" under the Queensland Government Nature Conservation Act 1992.

See also
List of Eucalyptus species

References

Eucalypts of Western Australia
Trees of Australia
tectifica
Myrtales of Australia
Taxa named by Ferdinand von Mueller
Plants described in 1859